Ameen Zakkar (born 15 June 1994) is a Syrian-born Qatari handball player for Khaleej and the Qatari national team.

References

External links

1994 births
Living people
Qatari male handball players
Handball players at the 2016 Summer Olympics
Olympic handball players of Qatar
Handball players at the 2014 Asian Games
Handball players at the 2018 Asian Games
Asian Games gold medalists for Qatar
Asian Games medalists in handball
Medalists at the 2014 Asian Games
Medalists at the 2018 Asian Games
People from Hama
Naturalised citizens of Qatar
Qatari people of Syrian descent